Sideroxylon canariense is a species of flowering plant in the family Sapotaceae. It It is endemic to the Canary Islands.

Description
S. canariense is an evergreen tree that grows up to 10 meters in height.

Distribution and habitat
S. canariense is found on steep slopes and ravines, and in dry laurel forests (laurisilva), between 100 and 1000 meters elevation.

Systematics
It was formerly considered a subspecies (canariense) of Sideroxylon mirmulans, which is native to Madeira.

References

Further reading

canariense
Flora of the Canary Islands
Vulnerable plants